Great Britain, represented by the British Olympic Association (BOA), competed at the 1988 Summer Olympics in Seoul, South Korea. 345 competitors, 219 men and 126 women, took part in 191 events in 22 sports. British athletes have competed in every Summer Olympic Games.


Medallists

Competitors
The following is the list of number of competitors in the Games.

Archery

In the fifth appearance by Great Britain in modern Olympic archery, the men's team won a bronze medal while Joanne Franks added another top eight finish in the women's individual and the women's team came in 5th.

Women's Individual Competition:
 Joanne Franks – Final (→ 7th place)
 Pauline Edwards – Quarterfinal (→ 17th place)
 Cheryl Sutton – Preliminary Round (→ 51st place)

Men's Individual Competition:
 Leroy Watson – Quarterfinals (→ 18th place)
 Steven Hallard – 1/8 finals (→ 21st place)
 Richard Priestman – Preliminary Round (→ 57th place)

Men's Team Competition:
 Watson, Hallard, and Priestman – Final (→ Bronze Medal)

Women's Team Competition:
 Franks, Edwards, and Sutton – Final (→ 5th place)

Athletics

Men's 100 metres 
Linford Christie
Barrington Williams
John Regis

Men's 200 metres 
Linford Christie
Michael Rosswess
John Regis

Men's 400 metres 
Brian Whittle
Todd Bennett

Men's 800 metres 
Peter Elliott
Steve Cram
Tom McKean

Men's 1.500 metres 
Peter Elliott
Steve Cram
Steve Crabb

Men's 5.000 metres 
 Eamonn Martin
 Jack Buckner
 Gary Staines

Men's 10.000 metres 
 Eamonn Martin
 First Round — 28:25.46
 Final — did not finish (→ no ranking)

 Steve Binns
 First Round — 28:52.88 (→ did not advance)

Men's Marathon 
 Charlie Spedding
 Final — 2"12:19 (→ 6th place)

 Dave Long
 Final — 2"16:18 (→ 21st place)

 Kevin Forster
 Final — 2"20:45 (→ 33rd place)

Men's 400 m Hurdles
 Kriss Akabusi
 Heat — 49.62 (2nd)
 Semi-Final — 49.22 (4th)
 Final — 48.69 (6th)

 Max Robertson
 Heat — 50.67 (5th → did not advance

 Philip Harries
 Heat — 50.81 (5th place → did not advance)

Men's 4 × 400 m Relay 
 Brian Whittle, Paul Harmsworth, Todd Bennett, and Philip Brown
 Heat — 3:04.18
 Brian Whittle, Kriss Akabusi, Todd Bennett, and Philip Brown
 Semi Final — 3:04.60
 Final — 3:02.00 (→ 5th place)

Men's 3,000 m Steeplechase
 Mark Rowland
 Heat — 8:31.40
 Semi Final — 8:18.31
 Final — 8:07.96 (→  Bronze Medal)

 Eddie Wedderburn
 Heat — 8:38.90
 Semi Final — 8:28.62 (→ did not advance)

 Roger Hackney
 Heat — 8:39.30
 Semi Final — did not finish (→ did not advance)

Men's Javelin Throw 
 David Ottley
 Qualification — 80.98 m
 Final — 76.96 m (→ 11th place)

 Roald Bradstock
 Qualification — 75.96 m (→ did not advance)

 Mick Hill
 Qualification — 77.20 m (→ did not advance)

Men's Discus Throw
 Paul Mardle
 Qualifying Heat – 58.28 m (→ did not advance)

Men's Hammer Throw
 Dave Smith
 Qualifying Heat — 69.12 m (→ did not advance)

 Matthew Mileham
 Qualifying Heat — 62.42 m (→ did not advance)

 Michael Jones
 Qualifying Heat — 70.38 m (→ did not advance)

Men's Shot Put
Tony Mercer
 Qualifying Heat – 16.28 m (→ did not advance)
Paul Edwards
 Qualifying Heat – 15.68 m (→ did not advance)

Men's Long Jump 
 Mark Forsythe
 Qualification — 7.77 m
 Final — 7.54 m (→ 12th place)

 Stewart Faulkner
 Qualification — 7.74 m (→ did not advance)

 John King
 Qualification — 7.57 m (→ did not advance)

Men's Decathlon 
 Daley Thompson — 8306 points (→ 4th place)
 100 metres — 10.62 s
 Long Jump — 7.38 m
 Shot Put — 15.02 m
 High Jump — 2.03 m
 400 metres — 49.06 s
 110 m Hurdles — 14.72 s
 Discus Throw — 44.80 m
 Pole Vault — 4.90 m
 Javelin Throw — 64.04 m
 1,500 metres — 4:45.11 s

 Alex Kruger — 7623 points (→ 24th place)
 100 metres — 11.30 s
 Long Jump — 6.97 m
 Shot Put — 12.23 m
 High Jump — 2.15 m
 400 metres — 49.98 s
 110 m Hurdles — 15.38 s
 Discus Throw — 38.72 m
 Pole Vault — 4.60 m
 Javelin Throw — 54.34 m
 1,500 metres — 4:37.84 s

 Greg Richards — 7237 points (→ 30th place)
 100 metres — 11.50 s
 Long Jump — 7.09 m
 Shot Put — 12.94 m
 High Jump — 1.82 m
 400 metres — 49.27 s
 110 m Hurdles — 15.56 s
 Discus Throw — 42.32 m
 Pole Vault — 4.50 m
 Javelin Throw — 53.50 m
 1,500 metres — 4:53.85 s

Men's 50 km Walk
 Les Morton
 Final — 3'59:30 (→ 27th place)

 Paul Blagg
 Final — 4'00:07 (→ 28th place)

Women's 4 × 400 m Relay 
 Linda Keough, Jennifer Stoute, Janet Smith, and Sally Gunnell
 Heat — 3:28.52
 Linda Keough, Jennifer Stoute, Angela Piggford, and Sally Gunnell
 Final — 3:26.89 (→ 6th place)

Women's Marathon 
 Angie Pain — 2"30.51 (→ 10th place)
 Susan Tooby — 2"31.33 (→ 12th place)
 Susan Crehan — 2"36.57 (→ 32nd place)

Women's Discus Throw
 Jacqueline McKernan
 Qualification – 50.92 m (→ did not advance)

Women's Javelin Throw
 Fatima Whitbread
 Qualification – 68.44 m
 Final – 70.32 m (→  Silver Medal)

 Tessa Sanderson
 Qualification – 56.70 m (→ did not advance)

 Sharon Gibson
 Qualification – 56.00 m (→ did not advance)

Women's Shot Put
 Yvonne Hanson-Nortey
 Qualification – 15.13 m (→ did not advance)

 Judy Oakes
 Qualification – 18.34 m (→ did not advance)

 Myrtle Augee
 Qualification – 17.31 m (→ did not advance)

Women's Heptathlon 
 Kim Hagger
 Final Result — 5975 points (→ 17th place)

 Joanne Mulliner
 Final Result — 5746 points (→ 19th place)

 Judy Simpson
 Final Result — 1951 points (→ 29th place) - (withdrew after two events)

Boxing

Men's Light Flyweight (– 48 kg)
 Mark Epton
 First Round – Defeated Damber Bhatta (Nepal) on points
 Second Round – Lost to Ivailo Marinov (Bulgaria) on points

Men's Flyweight (– 51 kg) 
 John Lyon
 First Round — Lost to Ramzan Gul (Turkey), on points (1:4)

Men's Featherweight (– 57 kg)
 Dave Anderson
 First Round – Defeated Domingo Damigella (Argentina) on points
 Second Round – Defeated Paul Fitzgerald (Ireland) on points
 Third Round – Lost to Regilio Tuur (Netherlands) on points

Men's Heavyweight (– 91 kg)
 Henry Akinwande
 First Round – Bye
 Second Round – Lost to Arnold Vanderlyde (Netherlands) on points

Canoeing

Cycling

Seventeen cyclists, thirteen men and four women, represented Great Britain in 1988.

Men's road race
 Neil Hoban
 Paul Curran
 Mark Gornall

Men's team time trial
 Phil Bateman
 Harry Lodge
 Ben Luckwell
 David Spencer

Men's sprint
 Eddie Alexander

Men's individual pursuit
 Colin Sturgess

Men's team pursuit
 Chris Boardman
 Robert Coull
 Simon Lillistone
 Glen Sword

Women's road race
 Maria Blower — 2:00:52 (→ 6th place)
 Sally Hodge — 2:00:52 (→ 9th place)
 Lisa Brambani — 2:00:52 (→ 11th place)

Women's sprint
 Louise Jones

Diving

Equestrian

Fencing

13 fencers, 8 men and 5 women, represented Great Britain in 1988.

Men's foil
 Pierre Harper
 Bill Gosbee
 Donnie McKenzie

Men's team foil
 Tony Bartlett, Jonathan Davis, Bill Gosbee, Pierre Harper, Donnie McKenzie

Men's épée
 John Llewellyn
 Hugh Kernohan

Men's sabre
 Mark Slade

Women's foil
 Liz Thurley
 Fiona McIntosh
 Linda Ann Martin

Women's team foil
 Ann Brannon, Linda Ann Martin, Fiona McIntosh, Linda Strachan, Liz Thurley

Gymnastics

Hockey

Men's team competition
Preliminary round (group A)
 Great Britain – South Korea 2-2
 Great Britain – Canada 3-0
 Great Britain – West Germany 1-2
 Great Britain – Soviet Union 3-1
 Great Britain – India 3-0
Semi Finals
 Great Britain – Australia 3-2
Final
 Great Britain – West Germany 3-1 (→  Gold Medal)

Team roster
 ( 1.) Ian Taylor (gk)
 ( 2.) Veryan Pappin (gk)
 ( 3.) David Faulkner
 ( 4.) Paul Barber
 ( 5.) Stephen Martin
 ( 6.) Jon Potter
 ( 7.) Richard Dodds
 ( 8.) Martyn Grimley
 ( 9.) Stephen Batchelor
 (10.) Richard Leman
 (11.) Jimmy Kirkwood
 (12.) Kulbir Bhaura
 (13.) Sean Kerly
 (14.) Robert Clift
 (15.) Imran Sherwani
 (16.) Russell Garcia
Head coach: David Whitaker

Women's Team Competition
Preliminary round (group A)
 Great Britain – Argentina 1-0
 Great Britain – The Netherlands 1-5
 Great Britain – United States 2-2
Semi Finals
 Great Britain – South Korea 0-1
Bronze Medal Match
 Great Britain – The Netherlands 1-3 (→ Fourth place)

Team roster
 Jill Atkins
 Wendy Banks (gk)
 Gill Brown
 Karen Brown
 Mary Nevill
 Julie Cook (gk)
 Vickey Dixon
 Wendy Fraser
 Barbara Hambly (c)
 Caroline Jordan
 Violet McBride
 Moira McLeod
 Caroline Brewer
 Jane Sixsmith
 Kate Parker
 Alison Ramsay
Head coach: Dennis Hay

Judo

Modern pentathlon

Three male pentathletes represented Great Britain in 1988. They won bronze in the team event.

Men's Individual Competition:
 Richard Phelps – 5229 pts (→ 6th place)
 Dominic Mahony – 5047 pts (→ 16th place)
 Graham Brookhouse – 5000 pts (→ 21st place)

Men's Team Competition:
 Phelps, Mahony, and Brookhouse – 15276 pts (→ Bronze Medal)

Rhythmic gymnastics

Rowing

Men's coxless pair  
 Andy Holmes, Steve Redgrave
 (→  Gold Medal)

Men's coxed pair
Andy Holmes,  Steve Redgrave, Patrick Sweeney,
 (→  Bronze Medal)

Men's coxless four 
 Simon Berrisford, Mark Buckingham, Peter Mulkerrins, Stephen Peel
 (→ 4th place)

Men's coxed four 
Martin Cross, Adam Clift, John Maxey, John Garrett, Vaughan Thomas
 (→ 4th place)

Eight 
 Nicholas Burfitt, Peter Beaumont, Terence Dillon, Anton Obholzer, Simon Jefferies, Salih Hassan, Richard Stanhope, Gavin Stewart, Stephen Turner
 (→ 4th place)

Women's double scull  
 Sally Andreae, Alison Gill
 (→ 9th place)

Women's coxless pair  
 Alison Bonner, Kim Thomas
 (→ 8th place)

Women's coxed four
Fiona Johnston, Kate Grose, Joanne Gough, Susan Smith, Alison Norrish
 (→ 6th place)

Sailing

Shooting

Swimming

Men's 50 m freestyle
 Mark Foster
 Heat – 23.51 (→ did not advance, 22nd place)

 Mike Fibbens
 Heat – 23.67 (→ did not advance, 25th place)

Men's 100 m freestyle
 Andy Jameson
 Heat – 51.18 (→ did not advance, 21st place)

 Roland Lee
 Heat – 51.20 (→ did not advance, 22nd place)

Men's 200 m freestyle
 Paul Howe
 Heat – 1:51.22
 B-Final – 1:51.99 (→ 16th  place)

 Michael Green
 Heat – 1:53.03 (→ did not advance, 27th place)

Men's 400 m freestyle
 Kevin Boyd
 Heat – 3:50.01
 Final – 3:50.16 (→ 7th  place)

 Tony Day
 Heat – 3:57.91 (→ did not advance, 24th place)

Men's 1500 m freestyle
 Kevin Boyd
 Heat – 15:17.56
 Final – 15:21.16 (→ 7th  place)

 Tony Day
 Heat – 15:38.75 (→ did not advance, 22nd place)

Men's 100 m backstroke
 Neil Harper
 Heat – 58.02 (→ did not advance, 22nd place)

 Neil Cochran
 Heat – 58.25 (→ did not advance, 25th place)

Men's 200 m backstroke
 Gary Binfield
 Heat – 2:03.79
 B-Final – 2:04.90 (→ 16th place)

 John Davey
 Heat – 2:04.70 (→ did not advance, 20th place)

Men's 100 m breaststroke
 Adrian Moorhouse
 Heat – 1:02.19
 Final – 1:02.04 (→  Gold Medal)

 James Parrack
 Heat – 1:04.23 (→ did not advance, 17th place)

Men's 200 m breaststroke
 Nick Gillingham
 Heat – 2:14.58
 Final – 2:14.12 (→  Silver Medal)

 Adrian Moorhouse
 Heat – 2:18.51 (→ 15th place)
 B-Final – scratched (→ did not advance, no ranking)

Men's 100 m butterfly
 Andy Jameson
 Heat – 53.34
 Final – 53.30 (→  Bronze Medal)

 Neil Cochran
 Heat – 54.75
 B-Final – 55.22 (→ 16th place)

Men's 200 m butterfly
 Tim Jones
 Heat – 2:01.01
 B-Final – 2:00.32 (→ 10th place)

 Nick Hodgson
 Heat – 2:01.44
 B-Final – 2:01.09 (→ 12th place)

Men's 200 m individual medley
 John Davey
 Heat – 2:05.55
 B-Final – 2:04.17 (→ 10th place)

 Neil Cochran
 Heat – 2:05.56
 B-Final – 2:05.44 (→ 11th place)

Men's 400 m individual medley
 Paul Brew
 Heat – 4:27.22
 B-Final – 4:26.77 (→ 15th place)

 John Davey
 Heat – DSQ (→ did not advance, no ranking)

Men's 4 × 100 m freestyle relay
 Andy Jameson, Mark Foster, Mike Fibbens, and Roland Lee
 Heat – 3:23.71
 Mike Fibbens, Mark Foster, Roland Lee, and Andy Jameson
 Final – 3:21.71 (→ 7th place)

Men's 4 × 200 m freestyle relay
 Kevin Boyd, Paul Howe, Jonathan Broughton, and Roland Lee
 Heat – 7:29.77 (→ did not advance, 9th place)

Men's 4 × 100 m medley relay
 Neil Harper, Adrian Moorhouse, Andy Jameson, and Mark Foster
 Heat – DSQ (→ did not advance, no ranking)

Women's 50 m freestyle
 Alison Sheppard
 Heat – 27.14 (→ did not advance, 25th place)

 Annabelle Cripps
 Heat – 27.17 (→ did not advance, 27th place)

Women's 100 m freestyle
 Annabelle Cripps
 Heat – 57.81 (→ did not advance, 25th place)

 June Croft
 Heat – 58.19 (→ did not advance, 28th place)

Women's 200 m freestyle
 Ruth Gilfillan
 Heat – 2:02.11
 B-Final – 2:01.66 (→ 10th place)

 June Croft
 Heat – 2:03.63 (→ did not advance, 21st place)

Women's 400 m freestyle
 Ruth Gilfillan
 Heat – 4:16.66 (→ did not advance, 18th place)

 June Croft
 Heat – 4:21.98 (→ did not advance, 27th place)

Women's 800 m freestyle
 Karen Mellor (swimmer)
 Heat – 8:44.64 (→ did not advance, 16th place)

 Tracey Atkin
 Heat – 9:00.04 (→ did not advance, 25th place)

Women's 100 m backstroke
 Kathy Read
 Heat – 1:04.62
 B-Final – 1:04.27 (→ 16th place)

 Sharon Page
 Heat – 1:04.75 (→ did not advance, 18th place)

Women's 200 m backstroke
 Kathy Read
 Heat – 2:17.22
 B-Final – 2:18.20 (→ 12th place)

 Helen Slatter
 Heat – 2:21.66 (→ did not advance, 22nd place)

Women's 100 m breaststroke
 Susannah Brownsdon
 Heat – 1:11.66
 B-Final – 1:11.95 (→ 16th place)

 Margaret Hohmann
 Heat – 1:12.67 (→ did not advance, 20th place)

Women's 200 m breaststroke
 Susannah Brownsdon
 Heat – 2:36.14 (→ 20th place)

 Helen Frank
 Heat – 2:41.12 (→ did not advance, 33rd place)

Women's 100 m butterfly
 Caroline Foot
 Heat – 1:02.76 (→ did not advance, 18th place)

 Annabelle Cripps
 Heat – 1:03.34 (→ did not advance, 21st place)

Women's 200 m butterfly
 Helen Bewley
 Heat – 2:17.10
 B-Final – 2:17.11 (→ 15th place)

 Lynne Wilson
 Heat – 2:17.28
 B-Final – 2:18.66 (→ 16th place)

Women's 200 m individual medley
 Jean Hill
 Heat – 2:17.57
 B-Final – 2:19.20 (→ 11th place)

 Zara Long
 Heat – 2:22.64 (→ did not advance, 23rd place)

Women's 400 m individual medley
 Tracey Atkin
 Heat – 5:01.34
 B-Final – 4:55.92 (→ 24th place)

 Susannah Brownsdon
 Heat – 4:54.66 (→ did not advance, 18th place)

Women's 4 × 100 m freestyle relay
 Annabelle Cripps, June Croft, Linda Donnelly, and Joanna Coull
 Heat – 3:50.84  (→ did not advance, 10th place)

Women's 4 × 100 m medley relay
 Katharine Read, Susannah Brownsdon, Caroline Foot, and Joanna Coull
 Heat – 4:16.18 (→ did not advance, 9th place)

Synchronized swimming

Three synchronized swimmers represented Great Britain in 1988.

Women's solo
 Nicola Shearn
 Lian Goodwin
 Joanne Seeburg

Women's duet
 Nicola Shearn
 Lian Goodwin

Table tennis

Tennis

Women's Singles Competition
 Sara Gomer
 First Round – Defeated Belinda Cordwell (New Zealand) 4-6 7-5 6-2
 Second Round – Lost to Larisa Neiland (Soviet Union) 7-6 6-7 7-9

 Clare Wood
 First Round – Lost to Wendy Turnbull (Australia) 1-6 3-6

Weightlifting

Wrestling

See also
 Sally Jones, first woman BBC sports presenter at the Seoul Olympics.

References

Nations at the 1988 Summer Olympics
1988
Summer Olympics